General elections were held in Guatemala on 7 November 1999, with a second round of the presidential elections on 26 December. Alfonso Portillo won the presidential elections, whilst his Guatemalan Republican Front also won the Congressional elections. Voter turnout was 53.8% on 7 November and 40.4% on 26 December.

Media owner Remigio Ángel González gave more than $2.6 million and free airtime to Alfonso Portillo's campaign, which led to some political analysts to claim that the free adverts helped Portillo win the election. After becoming president, Portillo appointed Gonzalez's brother-in-law Luis Rabbé to the post of Minister of Communications, Infrastructure and Housing, a post which included responsibility for overseeing the broadcast media.  The presidential election also established a pattern for the next 16 years in which the runner-up of the previous contest then went on to win.

Results

President

Congress

References

Bibliography
Villagrán Kramer, Francisco. Biografía política de Guatemala: años de guerra y años de paz. FLACSO-Guatemala, 2004.
Political handbook of the world 1999. New York, 2000.

Elections in Guatemala
Guatemala
1999 in Guatemala
Presidential elections in Guatemala